The Samsung Galaxy Tab A 9.7 is a 9.7-inch Android-based tablet computer produced and marketed by Samsung Electronics. It belongs to the mid-range Samsung Galaxy Tab A series, which also includes an 8.0-inch model, the Samsung Galaxy Tab A 8.0. It was announced in March 2015, and subsequently released on 1 May 2015.

History 
The Galaxy Tab A 9.7 was announced together with the smaller Galaxy Tab A 8.0 in March 2015.

Features
The Galaxy Tab A 9.7 is released with Android 5.0 Lollipop. Samsung has customized the interface with its TouchWiz software. As well as the standard suite of Google apps, it has Samsung apps such as S Planner, WatchON, Smart Stay, Multi-Window, Group Play, Multi-user mode, SideSync 4.0. The S-Pen models are also equipped with the S-Pen suite found in the Samsung Galaxy Note series.

The  Galaxy Tab A 9.7 equipped models are available in WiFi-only and 4G/LTE & WiFi variants. Storage ranges from 16 GB to 32 GB depending on the model, with a microSDXC card slot for expansion up to 512 GB. It has a 9.7-inch TFT LCD screen with a resolution of 1024x768 pixels and a pixel density of 132 ppi. It also features a 2 MP front camera without flash and a rear-facing 5.0 MP AF camera without flash.

Software

The Galaxy Tab A was released with Android 5.0.2 Lollipop.

Unlike the smaller 8.0 inch model, the rollout of the Android Marshmallow Update started in May 2016. The Android 7.1.1 Nougat started in September 2017.

See also
Comparison of tablet computers
Samsung Galaxy Tab series
Samsung Galaxy Tab A 8.0

References

External links

Samsung Galaxy Tab series
Android (operating system) devices
Tablet computers introduced in 2015
Tablet computers